The 1991 Bremen state election was held on 29 September 1991 to elect the members of the Bürgerschaft of Bremen, as well as the city councils of Bremen and Bremerhaven. The incumbent Social Democratic Party (SPD) government led by Mayor Klaus Wedemeier lost its majority, suffering an 11.7-point swing against it. The SPD subsequently formed a traffic light coalition with The Greens and the Free Democratic Party (FDP), and Wedemeier was re-elected as Mayor.

Parties
The table below lists parties represented in the previous Bürgerschaft of Bremen.

Election result

|-
! colspan="2" | Party
! Votes
! %
! +/-
! Seats
! +/-
! Seats %
|-
| bgcolor=| 
| align=left | Social Democratic Party (SPD)
| align=right| 143,576
| align=right| 38.8
| align=right| 11.7
| align=right| 41
| align=right| 13
| align=right| 41.0
|-
| bgcolor=| 
| align=left | Christian Democratic Union (CDU)
| align=right| 113,512
| align=right| 30.7
| align=right| 7.3
| align=right| 32
| align=right| 7
| align=right| 32.0
|-
| bgcolor=| 
| align=left | The Greens (Grüne)
| align=right| 42,096
| align=right| 11.4
| align=right| 1.2
| align=right| 11
| align=right| 1
| align=right| 11.0
|-
| bgcolor=| 
| align=left | Free Democratic Party (FDP)
| align=right| 35,087
| align=right| 9.5
| align=right| 0.5
| align=right| 10
| align=right| ±0
| align=right| 1.0
|-
| bgcolor=| 
| align=left | German People's Union (DVU)
| align=right| 22,878
| align=right| 6.2
| align=right| 2.8
| align=right| 6
| align=right| 5
| align=right| 6.0
|-
! colspan=8|
|-
| bgcolor=grey| 
| align=left | The Grays – Gray Panthers (GRAUE)
| align=right| 6,157
| align=right| 1.7
| align=right| New
| align=right| 0
| align=right| New
| align=right| 0
|-
| bgcolor=| 
| align=left | The Republicans (REP)
| align=right| 5,694
| align=right| 1.5
| align=right| 0.3
| align=right| 0
| align=right| ±0
| align=right| 0
|-
| bgcolor=|
| align=left | Others
| align=right| 1,148
| align=right| 0.3
| align=right| 
| align=right| 0
| align=right| ±0
| align=right| 0
|-
! align=right colspan=2| Total
! align=right| 370,148
! align=right| 100.0
! align=right| 
! align=right| 100
! align=right| ±0
! align=right| 
|-
! align=right colspan=2| Voter turnout
! align=right| 
! align=right| 72.2
! align=right| 3.4
! align=right| 
! align=right| 
! align=right| 
|}

References
 Bürgerschaft Bremen seit 1945

Elections in Bremen (state)
Bremen
September 1991 events in Europe